Jožef Krajnc, also spelled Josef Krainc, Josef Krainz (17 February 1821 – 22 February 1875) was an Austro-Hungarian lawyer, philosopher and politician of Slovenian ancestry.

Life 
Krajnc was born in Škale (today part of Velenje) in the Duchy of Styria to a farmer of the same name. From 1832 until 1841 he attended the Gymnasium in Celje, graduating with the Matura. From 1841 until 1845, he studied philosophy and law in Graz, obtaining a doctorate in both disciplines. From 1842 on, he financed his studies as a private tutor to a wealthy landowner's family in Graz and Bad Radkersburg. From 1845 on, Krajnc worked as judicial advisor first to the city council of Radkersburg, then to the council of Graz. For a short time in 1847, he worked as a judge in Graz.

In the course of the March Revolution, Krajnc served as a member of the Austrian Reichstag from 1848 to 1849, filling in for Vinzenz Gurnigg, who did not accept his mandate. Among other duties, Krajnc was a member of the Reichstag's constitutional committee.

From 1850 on, Krajnc taught civil law at the University of Graz, first as an extraordinary, from 1852 on as ordinary professor. His courses were given in Slovene. After his chair was dissolved in 1854, he worked for a short time as a consultant to the Austrian ministry of finances in Laibach, before receiving a teaching position for civil, business and exchange law at the Handelsakademie in Hermannstadt in 1855. Krajnc kept this position until 1870, when he became professor of Austrian civil law and German common law at the University of Innsbruck.

In 1871, Krajnc was appointed professor of civil law in Prague. This appointment soon turned into a political issue. The climate at the University of Prague was dominated and severely poisoned by deep animosities between German-Austrians and Czechs, both among teaching staff as well as among students. Many German-Austrians perceived Krajnc as a protégé of Austria's Minister of Education Josef Jireček, who was of Czech ancestry, and took the sudden and forced early retirement of Krajnc's German predecessor as an affront. A group of German-speaking students, among their leaders Fritz Mauthner, caused his inaugural lecture to end in riots. A note of protest against Krajnc's appointment was written by German-Austrian students at the University's faculty of law and directed to the Austrian Ministry of Education, but to no avail.

Krajnc died in Prague in 1875.

Family 
Jožef Krajnc married Maria Petritsch in 1858. The marriage produced two sons and one daughter.

External links 
 Krainc (Krajnc, Krainz), Josef Dr. iur. Dr. phil. at parliament.gv.at (German)

1821 births
1875 deaths
People from the City Municipality of Velenje
People from the Duchy of Styria
Slovenian politicians
Members of the Imperial Diet (Austria)
Slovenian lawyers
19th-century Austrian philosophers
19th-century Austrian lawyers
19th-century Slovenian philosophers